The Honor 6 and Honor 6 Plus are the mid-range Android smartphones produced by Huawei. It was released in August 2014.
It is the second mid-range phone series of Huawei's sub-brand Honor. Honor 6 has a 5.0-inch in-plane switching liquid crystal display and runs on Android 6.0, paired with EMUI 3.1 after latest update, while Honor 6 Plus has a 5.5-inch display and bigger size dimensions.
Honor 6 is the second phone by Honor which uses HiSilicon Kirin 920 chipset, while the Honor 6 Plus uses Kirin 925.

Specifications
The 2 phones has 3 GB of random access memory, 16 or 32 gigabytes of internal storage and is connectable using Bluetooth 4.0, Wifi 802.11 a/b/g/n and 2G/3G/4G LTE.
It also has global positioning system function. Honor 6 has a 13MP rear camera with autofocus, and 5MP front camera. However, the Honor 6 Plus has a 8MP rear camera with autofocus, paired with 2MP depth sensor and a 8MP front camera.

Source
https://www.gsmarena.com/honor_6-6461.php

Android (operating system) devices
Mobile phones introduced in 2014
Huawei mobile phones
Discontinued smartphones
Mobile phones with infrared transmitter